Sawadi may refer to:

Sawadi, Myanmar
Al Sawadi, Oman

See also
 Sawad (disambiguation)
 Sawadin